This is an episode listing for the BBC television show Victoria Wood: As Seen on TV, with the episodes' original airdates listed.

Series overview

Episodes

Series 1 (1985)

Series 2 (1986)

Special (1987)

References

Lists of British comedy television series episodes
BBC-related lists